"There was no such thing as Palestinians" is part of a widely repeated statement by the then-newly appointed Israeli Prime Minister Golda Meir in an interview with Frank Giles, then deputy editor of The Sunday Times on June 15, 1969, to mark the second anniversary of the Six-Day War. It is considered to be the most famous example of Israeli denial of Palestinian identity.

Interviews

Initial statement
The interview entitled Who can blame Israel was published in The Sunday Times on June 15, 1969, and included the following exchange:
 Frank Giles: Do you think the emergence of the Palestinian fighting forces, the Fedayeen, is an important new factor in the Middle East?
 Golda Meir: Important, no. A new factor, yes. There was no such thing as Palestinians. When was there an independent Palestinian people with a Palestinian state? It was either southern Syria before the First World War and then it was a Palestine including Jordan. It was not as though there was a Palestinian people in Palestine considering itself as a Palestinian people and we came and threw them out and took their country from them. They did not exist.

Later clarifications
In a 1970 interview with Thames TV, Meir said that: "When were Palestinians born? What was all of this area before the First World War when Britain got the Mandate over Palestine? What was Palestine, then? Palestine was then the area between the Mediterranean and the Iraqian border. East and West Bank was Palestine. I am a Palestinian, from 1921 and 1948, I carried a Palestinian passport. There was no such thing in this area as Jews, and Arabs, and Palestinians, There were Jews and Arabs. [...] I don't say there are no Palestinians, but I say there is no such thing as a distinct Palestinian people." Meir's description of Mandatory Palestine and Palestinian citizenship extending to Transjordan was incorrect.

In a 1972 interview with The New York Times, Meir was asked if she stood by the comments; she replied: "I said there never was a Palestinian nation".

Commentary

Contextualisation
Barbara McKean Parmenter reflected on the statement in its wider context:
In one sense she was right. There was no Palestine in the Western sense of a nation-state and no Palestinian people in the Western sense of a national group taking explicit possession of and improving its national territory. By Western definition, Palestinians, like many other native peoples around the world, did not exist.

James Gelvin commented on the quote along similar lines:
The fact that Palestinian nationalism developed later than Zionism and indeed in response to it does not in any way diminish the legitimacy of Palestinian nationalism or make it less valid than Zionism. All nationalisms arise in opposition to some "other." Why else would there be the need to specify who you are? And all nationalisms are defined by what they oppose. As we have seen, Zionism itself arose in reaction to anti-Semitic and exclusionary nationalist movements in Europe. It would be perverse to judge Zionism as somehow less valid than European anti-Semitism or those nationalisms. Furthermore, Zionism itself was also defined by its opposition to the indigenous Palestinian inhabitants of the region. Both the "conquest of land" and the "conquest of labor" slogans that became central to the dominant strain of Zionism in the Yishuv originated as a result of the Zionist confrontation with the Palestinian "other."

Abraham Foxman wrote about the quote that:
The complete response makes it clear that Meir was talking not about the existence of Palestinians as individuals or even as a group, but the existence of a Palestinians nation. And she was stating a simple fact - that prior to the late 1960s no one, least of all the other Arab nations, had recognized the existence or even the potential existence of such a nation. ... Could Meir have made her point more clearly? Probably. And she paid dearly for her lack of clarity. Over the years, her words have repeatedly been cited by anti-Zionists (and sometimes by outright anti-Semites) to "demonstrate" the dismissiveness of Israeli leaders toward the Palestinian People."

Philip Ó Ceallaigh wrote about the quote that:
Of course, 100 years ago there was no such thing as an Israeli either. The “Israeli” and “Palestinian” nations have come into being simultaneously, and in conflict. The assertion of one is often formulated as the denial of the other."

Criticism
The quote has been frequently used to illustrate Israel's denial of Palestinian history, and is considered to sum up the Palestinians' sense of victimization by Israel. It is considered to be a successor to the early Christian Zionist phrase "A land without a people for a people without a land", and a predecessor of the controversial 1984 book From Time Immemorial and the 2017 satire A History of the Palestinian People.

Edward Said described it as Golda Meir's "most celebrated remark", whilst Al Jazeera wrote that "Meir's jingoistic comments concerning Palestinians remain one of her defining – and most damning – legacies."

See also
Phrases and quotations
 A land without a people for a people without a land
 Azzam Pasha quotation
 The bride is beautiful, but she is married to another man

References

1969 in international relations
Political quotes
Golda Meir